Google is an American multinational corporation specializing in internet-related services and products.

Google, Googel, or Googal may also refer to:

Google LLC
 Google Search, a web search engine
 Google (verb), using the Google search engine to obtain information on something or somebody on the World Wide Web
 List of Google products

Places
 Googal, Devadurga (sometimes spelled Google), a village in India
 Google, temporary name of Topeka, Kansas, United States

Fictional characters
 Google, monster in The Google Book (1913) by Vincent Cartwright Vickers
 Google, clown in Circus Days Again (1942) by Enid Blyton
 Barney Google, in the comic strip Barney Google and Snuffy Smith
 Google, on Sesame Street

See also
 .google, a Google-operated internet top-level domain
 Alphabet Inc., Google's holding company which trades as GOOG on the Nasdaq
 goo.gl, a URL shortening service
 Goggles, a protective eyewear
 Goggles!, a 1969 children's picture book
 Gogol (disambiguation)
 Googly (disambiguation)
 Googol, the number 10100 (represented by the digit 1 followed by 100 zeroes)
 List of Google products